A Happy Man (French: Un homme heureux) is a 1932 French film directed by Antonin Bideau. It is considered to be a lost film.

Cast
 Henri Bosc as Michel Guérard  
 Jacques Bousquet 
 Suzanne Christy as Simone Fontanet  
 Suzanne Dantès as Liouba Grebinsky  
 Claude Dauphin as Claude Moreuil  
 Lucette Desmoulins as Lulu  
 Alice Tissot as Madame Fontanet  
 Georges Tréville as Monsieur Pédoux

References

Bibliography 
 Waldman, Harry. Missing Reels: Lost Films of American and European Cinema. McFarland, 2000.

External links 
 

1932 films
1932 lost films
1930s French-language films
French black-and-white films
Lost French films
1930s French films